Winnipeg Rangers may refer to:

Winnipeg Rangers (1939–1957)
Winnipeg Rangers (1956–1967)